How It Works could refer to:

 How It Works Magazine, a magazine by Imagine Publishing
 How It Works, an album by punk-rock group Bodyjar
 How It Works, a UK science book published by Marshall Cavendish